Jonathan Oquendo Arnaldi (born August 3, 1983) is a Puerto Rican professional boxer who has challenged twice for a world title: the WBA (Regular) featherweight title in 2015, and the WBO junior lightweight title in September 2020. He has held multiple regional titles, including the WBO–NABO junior featherweight title in 2010 and the junior lightweight version from 2018 to 2019.

Professional career
Oquendo made his professional debut on June 25, 2004, scoring a third-round technical knockout (TKO) victory against Yuniel Ramos at the Civic Center in Kissimmee, Florida.

After compiling a record of 14–1 (9 KOs) he faced future two-weight world champion Juan Manuel López for the WBO Latino junior featherweight title on February 23, 2008, at the Coliseo Héctor Solá Bezares in Caguas, Puerto Rico. Oquendo suffered his second professional defeat, losing by third-round TKO. At the time of the stoppage he was behind on the scorecards, with all three judges scoring the bout in López' favor at 20–15, 19–16, and 19–17.

He bounced back from defeat with three wins, two by stoppage, before making a second attempt at the WBO Latino title, facing Jose Angel Beranza on February 27, 2010, at the Coliseo Rubén Rodríguez in Bayamón, Puerto Rico. Oquendo captured his first professional title, defeating Beranza via unanimous decision (UD) over twelve rounds, with the judges' scorecards reading 118–108, 117–109, and 114–112.

In his next fight he faced Eden Sonsona for the vacant WBO-NABO junior featherweight title on July 10, 2010, at the José Miguel Agrelot Coliseum. Oquendo captured his second regional title, defeating Sonsona via ninth-round knockout (KO). At the time of the stoppage Oquendo was ahead on the two of the judges' scorecards at 75–73 and 74–73, while the third judge scored the bout 75–74 in favour of Sonsona.

Following two more KO wins he made his third attempt for the WBO Latino title, this time facing Jose Luis Araiza for the vacant title on October 1, 2011, at the Coliseo Rubén Rodríguez. Oquendo dropped his opponent to the canvas in the first round en route to a second-round KO victory.

For his next fight he returned to the Coliseo Rubén Rodríguez, facing former world champion Wilfredo Vázquez Jr. for the vacant WBO International junior featherweight title on October 6, 2012. In a fight which Oquendo was winning on the scorecards, he was forced to go down to the canvas on one knee following a series of punches in round seven. He stayed down until the referee finished the count of ten, handing him a TKO defeat.

He came back from defeat to score two wins, one by stoppage, before suffering his fourth defeat at the hands of former two-weight world champion Abner Mares in July 2014. Eight months later he faced Gabino Cota for the WBO Latino interim featherweight title on March 6 at the Civic Center in Kissimmee, Florida. Oquendo captured the interim regional title with a wide UD win over ten rounds, with two judges scoring the bout 99–91 and the third scoring it 98–92.

Following a ten-round majority decision (MD) victory against former two-weight world champion Jhonny González in September, Oquendo got his first chance to fight for a world title, challenging WBA (Regular) featherweight champion Jesús Cuellar. The bout took place on December 5, 2015, at the Barclays Center in New York City, and served as part of the undercard for the Daniel Jacobs vs. Peter Quillin world title fight. Oquendo was sent down to the canvas in the fourth round en route to a UD loss, with one judge scoring the bout a shutout at 120–107 and the other two scoring it 116–111.

After his defeat to Cuellar, Oquendo he moved up a division to junior lightweight. He scored two stoppage wins before fighting for his first title at the weight—the WBO-NABO junior lightweight title—against Jose Lopez on October 6, 2018, at the Puerto Rico Convention Center in San Juan. Oquendo suffered a knockdown in the first round, only to go on to win the bout in the seventh round after a flurry of unanswered punches forced the referee to step in and call a halt to the contest, handing Oquendo a TKO win and the regional WBO title. 

Following an eight-round UD victory against Deivi Julio Bassa in a non-title fight in December, he made a defense of his title against Lamont Roach Jr., with Roach's WBO International title also on the line. The bout took place on May 4, 2019, at the T-Mobile Arena in Paradise, Nevada, and served as part of the undercard for the Canelo Álvarez vs. Daniel Jacobs world title fight. Oquendo suffered his sixth professional defeat, losing by a wide UD over ten rounds, with one judge scoring the bout 96–93 and the other two scoring it 97–92.

He came back from defeat to capture the vacant WBO Latino junior lightweight title on November 14, 2019, defeating Charles Huerta via UD over ten rounds at the Belasco Theater in Los Angeles, California, with all three judges scoring the bout 100–90.

He was set to make a second attempt at a world title, challenging WBO junior lightweight champion Jamel Herring. The bout was scheduled to take place on July 2, 2020, at the MGM Grand Conference Center, in Paradise, Nevada, however, after Herring tested positive for COVID-19, the bout was postponed to July 14. After Herring gave a negative test prior to July 14, he was given the go ahead to travel to the MGM Grand and enter 'the bubble'—a predesignated containment area at the MGM Grand for fighters, trainers and officials involved in the event—before taking another test for COVID-19. The second test, however, gave another positive result, causing the fight to be postponed once again with the new date being scheduled for September 5.

Professional boxing record

References

External links

Living people
1983 births
Puerto Rican male boxers
Super-bantamweight boxers
Featherweight boxers
Super-featherweight boxers
Sportspeople from Bayamón, Puerto Rico